Imogen Murphy is an Irish film and television director. In 2021 she was nominated for an Irish Film & Television Academy award. In 2020 she was lead director and co-story writer on Irish-Canadian murder mystery series Dead Still, which was nominated for the Royal Television Society Ireland Drama Award 2021, and for seven awards at the 17th Irish Film & Television Awards, including Best Drama, Best Script and Best Director.

Imogen Murphy's short film, Seanie & Flo, won the 2020 audience award at the Chicago Irish Film Festival. In 2018 she directed the second series of Irish comedy drama Can't Cope, Won't Cope, which was nominated for Best Drama Series at the 2019 Celtic Media Festival.

In 2017, she directed the film Cry Rosa which won the Kurzfilm Hamburg International Film Festival Mo Award, and was nominated for a Royal Television Society award as well as the award for best short drama at the 15th Irish Film & Television Awards. Previously Murphy directed blocks of drama series Red Rock and Hollyoaks.

Imogen Murphy is a graduate of the National Film School of Ireland at Dún Laoghaire Institute of Art, Design and Technology (IADT).

References

External links

Irish film directors
Irish television directors
Year of birth missing (living people)
Living people